Brays Creek is a town located in the Tweed Shire, in north-eastern New South Wales, Australia. Brays Creek has a creek running through it named Brays Creek after itself.

References 

Suburbs of Tweed Heads, New South Wales